Lionel Edward Dawson (1887–1976) was a philatelist who won the Crawford Medal from the Royal Philatelic Society London for his paper on The One Anna and Two Annas Postage Stamps of India, 1854-55. He was an expert on the stamps of India and the Feudatory States and signed the Roll of Distinguished Philatelists in 1961.

Dawson was the Editor of the Philatelic Journal of India between 1934 and 1944. In 1954 he delivered a paper to The Royal on "The Locally Printed Stamps of Tibet, 1912-1953" which was subsequently printed in The London Philatelist and in 1955 he won the Tilleard Medal from the society for his display of Indian Feudatory States.

A photograph of L.E. Dawson in a tweed jacket appears on page 2 in the catalog of his collection sold by Robson Lowe on 9 November 1966.

Publications 
The Postage Stamps of Jammu & Kashmir Simplified. Lahore: Philatelic Society of India, 1937. (With E.A. Smythies) Online excerpts.
The One Anna & Two Annas Postage Stamps of India, 1854-55. Birmingham: H. Garratt-Adams & Co. for the Philatelic Society of India, 1948.
The Postage Stamps of Nepal. New York: The Collectors Club, 1952. (with E.A. Smythies and H.D.S. Haverbeck)

References 

1976 deaths
1887 births
Philatelists
Philately of India
Philately of Tibet
Signatories to the Roll of Distinguished Philatelists